Mary Montgomerie Bennett (1881–1961) was an Australian activist for Indigenous justice, a teacher and advocate for Australian Aboriginal rights at a time when this was not usual amongst settler Australians.

Biography
Bennett's childhood was spent in both England and Australia, where her father Robert Christison had a station in north Queensland. By 1910, the family had sold up and relocated permanently to England. Bennett married Charles Douglas Bennett in 1914.

In 1927, she published Christison of Lammermoor, a biography of her father which was comparatively unusual at the time for its acknowledgement of settler violence towards Aborigines. Whilst in London she also published The Australian Aboriginal as a Human Being (1930). In 1930, after her husband had died, Bennett relocated to Perth, Western Australia to devote the rest of her life to Aboriginal welfare.

In 1932, Bennett settled at the Mount Margaret Mission near Laverton. Whilst working as a teacher of Aboriginal children, she was also actively involved in activist groups, including the Women's Service Guild.

Her work led to the formation of the Moseley Royal Commission in 1934. During her testimony before the Commission, Bennett condemned the alleged widespread sexual exploitation of Aboriginal women, as well as the forced removal of their children by the authorities.

In 1960, the year before her death, Bennett wrote to the Kalgoorlie Miner and asked its readers:

Bennett died in Kalgoorlie on 6 October 1961 and was buried with Churches of Christ rites in the Kalgoorlie cemetery. After her death, Bennett's personal archive, "a dossier of state malpractice and neglect on a significant scale", was stolen and has not been recovered. Her life's work was recognised when she was one of the inaugural inductees to the Victorian Honour Roll of Women in 2001.

Works

References

External links
 

1881 births
1961 deaths
Australian feminists
Australian human rights activists
Women human rights activists
20th-century Australian non-fiction writers
20th-century Australian women writers
British emigrants to Australia